Benjamin Green (July 1, 1713 – October 14, 1772) was a merchant, judge and political figure in Nova Scotia. He served as administrator for Nova Scotia in 1766 and from 1771 to 1772.

Career 
He was secretary to William Pepperrell, who led the attack against Louisbourg in 1745, and served as treasurer for the forces from New England and secretary for the council that administered Louisbourg after its capture. In 1749, he went to Halifax, where he was named to Edward Cornwallis's Nova Scotia Council and also served as naval officer. (Greene named his son Edward Cornwallis in honour of the Governor.) Green was also judge in the vice admiralty court; he resigned in 1753. In 1750, he became secretary to the Council and provincial treasurer. Green was named a justice of the peace in 1760. While in England to assist in auditing the accounts of Peregrine Thomas Hopson, he had to defend himself against charges of assigning contracts to Malachy Salter in exchange for a share in the profits. He was reprimanded but allowed to retain his posts. During his term as administrator in 1766, he was criticized by the provincial assembly for not following the correct procedures for dealing with the provincial finances. Green resigned his post as provincial treasurer in 1768, citing poor health.

Family 
He was born in Salem Village (later Danvers, Massachusetts), the son of the Reverend Joseph Green and Elizabeth Gerrish, and entered business with his brothers in Boston. In 1737, he married Margaret Pierce.

He died at Halifax at the age of 59 and is buried in the Old Burying Ground (Halifax, Nova Scotia). An audit of the provincial accounts following his death found them deficient.

Two of his daughters married the Newton brothers: John Newton (Nova Scotia politician) and Henry Newton (politician).

Legacy 
 namesake of Green Street, Halifax
 Green kept a Journal for William Pepperrell of the Siege of Louisburg (1744): 
 Great grandfather of Major Parker, of the Sebastopol Monument

Links 
A sermon, occasioned by the death of Mrs. Margaret Green; consort of the late Honourable Benjamin Green, esq; delivered at Halifax, in the province of Nova-Scotia, February 1st, 1778 (Halifax, [1778?])

See also 
 Nova Scotia Council
List of lieutenant governors of Nova Scotia
5th General Assembly of Nova Scotia

References

1713 births
1772 deaths
Governors of the Colony of Nova Scotia
Colony of Nova Scotia judges
People from Danvers, Massachusetts